Brian K. Kennedy is the former President and CEO of the Buck Institute for Research on Aging in Novato, California. Having started in July, 2010, Kennedy was asked to resign in October 2016. Kennedy's resignation raised serious questions about Buck Leadership.

Kennedy has published over 80 manuscripts in prestigious journals including Cell, Nature, Science, Genes & Development, and PNAS.  Potential public health benefits claimed in one study were questioned by the UK National Health Service in 2014.

Kennedy has served on the NIH Cellular Mechanisms of Aging and Development study section since 2006, acting as Committee Chair since 2010.  He has also served on the grant review committee for American Federation for Aging Research Grants since 2006.  He has acted as an Associate Editor for the Journal of Gerontology: Biological Science since 2006 and Cell Cycle since 2010.  Currently, he is co-Editor-in Chief of Aging Cell. Kennedy has served as a consultant for Biotech and Pharmaceutical companies and is a co-Founder of the Nuvita Animal Health Corporation, a now defunct dog food company. He is also Chairman of Mount Tam Biotechnologies, which is traded as a penny stock. In August 2016, Mount Tam Biotechnologies merged with Tabacalera Ysidron, a defunct cigar company which had failed in its plan to distribute Nicaraguan cigars.

References

External links
 Kennedy's Page at the National University of Singapore
 Kennedy's Page at the Buck Institute for Research on Aging
 Kennedy's Page at LinkedIn

Living people
Massachusetts Institute of Technology alumni
1967 births